Unmesh Bhaiyyasaheb Patil Elected in 17th Lok Sabha from Jalgaon Loksabha Constituency  and also member of the 13th Maharashtra Legislative Assembly. He represents the Chalisgaon Assembly Constituency. He belongs to the Bharatiya Janata Party.

Political career
Unmesh Patil is State General Secretary Maharashtra BJYM.

References

Maharashtra MLAs 2014–2019
People from Jalgaon district
Bharatiya Janata Party politicians from Maharashtra
Marathi politicians
Living people
1978 births